Raw Toonage is an American animated series that aired on CBS on September 19, 1992. The show was cancelled on December 5 after 12 episodes had been broadcast.

Bonkers and Marsupilami were spun off from this series in 1993. The Shnookums and Meat Funny Cartoon Show then was spun off from Marsupilami in 1995.

Cast

Main
 Jeff Bennett as Jitters A. Dog
 Rodger Bumpass as Grumbles the Grizzly
 Nancy Cartwright as Fawn Deer, Windy
 Jim Cummings as Bonkers D. Bobcat, Maurice, Norman, Don Karnage (guest star from TaleSpin)
 Steve Mackall as Marsupilami

Guest stars
 René Auberjonois as Chef Louie (from The Little Mermaid)
 Corey Burton as Ludwig Von Drake, Captain Hook (from Peter Pan), Robin Hoof
 Christine Cavanaugh as Gosalyn Mallard (from Darkwing Duck)
 Bill Farmer as Goofy (with his style from Goof Troop)
 Frank Welker as Leonardo the Refined Lion
 Terry McGovern as Launchpad McQuack (from DuckTales and Darkwing Duck)
 Russi Taylor as Webby Vanderquack (from DuckTales)
 Samuel E. Wright as Sebastian (from The Little Mermaid)
 Alan Young as Scrooge McDuck (from DuckTales)

Crew
 Ginny McSwain – Dialogue Director
 Jamie Thomason – Talent Coordinator

Segments
 Gray = Hosting (9 segments)
 Blue = He's Bonkers (11 segments)
 Yellow = Marsupilami (16 segments)
 Green = Totally Tasteless Video (11 segments)
 Gray also indicates Goofy starring in "Goofy's Guide to the Olympics" in the sixth episode.

History and production
The idea for the show had an unusual genesis. Walt Disney Television Animation was developing a 65-episode half-hour series for their Disney Afternoon block entitled He's Bonkers D. Bobcat. The premise was similar to Who Framed Roger Rabbit, as the series dealt with the lead character's adventures post-stardom. The actual production of this series was troubled. At the same time, Michael Eisner had purchased the rights to the popular Belgian comic strip Marsupilami. At some point, someone had the post-modern idea to actually make the cartoons that Bonkers had starred in before becoming a policeman, and Disney's Raw Toonage was born. Totally Tasteless Video was intended as a satire of popular culture. A host was added to give the show the familiar feel of the World of Disney show.

Due to the shorter production schedule, Disney's Raw Toonage was on the air before the above-mentioned half-hour show, thus adding some credibility to the back story. The show typically opens with an introduction by a famous character from Disney (such as Goofy with his style from Disney's Goof Troop), who attempts to share some of their expertise with the audience; then the show has a few of the above-mentioned shorts chained in a row, rounding out the half hour.

The premise of the Bonkers segments is that Bonkers is a delivery person, usually assisted by Jitters A. Dog. Conflict is provided by Bonkers' unrequited love for Fawn Deer. Each of the Bonkers segments were eventually included in the half-hour "Bonkers" series, while every one but three ("Wannabe Ruler?", "The Young and the Nestless", and "Hot Spots") of the Marsupilami segments were not included in the half-hour "Marsupilami" series. The Marsupilami segments took the look of the character from the Belgian comic, but the characterization differs significantly; Marsupilami is more anthropomorphized, and speaks the language of the human characters fluently, Marsupilami in the comics can only say variations of "houba" and mimic sounds like a parrot. The secondary characters in Disney's Marsupilami series are completely different from those of the comics; in the Disney cartoons, Marsupilami is most often opposed by Norman, who appears in various different roles.

Totally Tasteless Video did each show in a different style. They were story edited by Tom Minton, who later write Pinky and the Brain at Warner Bros. The first Totally Tasteless Video segment is a parody of movie coming attraction trailers, followed by a spoof on Doogie Howser, M.D. Other notable segments involve a badly animated superhero, a prehistoric spoof of Magnum, P.I., an exorchicken fighting chicken ghosts that haunt a family, and a Robin Hood twist in the Jay Ward style of cartoons. Larry Latham produced and directed the Bonkers, Totally Tasteless Video, and host segments; Ed Wexler produced and directed Marsupilami. At least one of the Marsupilami cartoons was produced with the idea of a theatrical run in mind.

Reruns of the show were aired on Disney Channel, and Toon Disney. Disney's Raw Toonage was nominated for a Daytime Emmy in the category of outstanding writing in an animated program and Outstanding Music Direction and Composition in 1993. Music composed by Stephen James Taylor (character themes and underscore), Mark Watters, Eric Schmidt, Jerry Grant, Walter Murphy, and Craig Stuart Garfinkle.

References

External links

 
 
 

1990s American animated television series
1990s American anthology television series
1992 American television series debuts
1992 American television series endings
American children's animated anthology television series
American children's animated comedy television series
English-language television shows
CBS original programming
Television series by Disney Television Animation
Comedy franchises
Internet memes
Film and television memes
Bonkers (TV series)